Dolophrades is a genus of longhorn beetles of the subfamily Lamiinae, containing the following species:

 Dolophrades birmanus Breuning, 1958
 Dolophrades mustanganus Holzschuh, 2003
 Dolophrades punctatus Bates, 1884
 Dolophrades terrenus (Pic, 1934)

References

Morimopsini